Khanakul Assembly constituency is an assembly constituency in Hooghly district in the Indian state of West Bengal.

Overview
As per orders of the Delimitation Commission, No. 202 Khanakul Assembly constituency is composed of the following: Khanakul II community development block, and Ghoshpur, Khanakul I, Khanakul II, Kishorpur I, Kishorpur II, Pole II, Thakuranichak I, and Thakuranichak II gram panchayats of Khanakul I community development block.

Khanakul Assembly constituency is part of No. 29 Arambagh (Lok Sabha constituency) (SC).

Members of Legislative Assembly

Election results

2021

2016

2011
In the 2011 elections, Iqbal Ahmed of Trinamool Congress defeated his nearest rival Subhra Parui of CPI(M).

   

.# Swing calculated on Congress+Trinamool Congress vote percentages taken together in 2006.

1977-2006
In the 2006, 2001 and 1996 state assembly elections Banshi Badan Maitra of CPI(M) won the Khanakul assembly seat (SC) defeating Kalyan Maji of Trinamool Congress in 2006, Tarapada Dolui of Trinamool Congress in 2001, and Basudeb Hajra of Congress in 1996. Contests in most years were multi cornered but only winners and runners are being mentioned. Sachindra Nath Hazra of CPI(M) defeated Banshari Mohan Sardar of Congress in 1991, Basudeb Hajra of Congress in 1987 and 1982. Panchanan Digpati of Janata Party defeated Sachindra Nath Hazra of CPI(M) in 1977.

1957-1972
Basudeb Hajra of Congress won in 1972. Madan Saha of CPI(M) won in 1971, 1969 and 1967. Krishna Pada Pandit of Congress won in 1962. Panchanan Digpati and Prafulla Chandra Sen, both of Congress, won the dual seat at Khanakul in 1957.

References

Assembly constituencies of West Bengal
Politics of Hooghly district